Yeoui-dong is a dong (neighborhood) of Yeongdeungpo-gu in Seoul, South Korea.

Before 1 July 1980 it was called Yeouido-dong.

Attractions
 National Assembly of South Korea
 Munhwa Broadcasting Corporation (MBC)
 Korean Broadcasting System (KBS) - KBS New Wing Open Hall located in Yeoui-dong, is the broadcast and recording studio of many KBS programs with a studio audience, namely the live weekly music show Music Bank.
 63 Building
 Yeouido
 Yeouido Park
 International Financial Center Seoul
IFC Office Towers - opened in 2011 
IFC Mall Seoul - opened in August 2012
 Conrad Seoul - opened on 12 November 2012
 Yoido Full Gospel Church

Economy

Hanjin Shipping, LG Corp., and Keoyang Shipping are headquartered in Yeoui-dong.

See also 
Administrative divisions of South Korea

References

External links
Yeongdeungpo-gu official website
 Yeongdeungpo-gu map at Yeongdeungpo-gu official website
 Yeoui-dong resident office website

Yeouido
Neighbourhoods of Yeongdeungpo District